An economic development incentive can be strictly defined as “cash or near-cash assistance provided on a discretionary basis to attract or retain business operations. In practice, however, it is a broadly used term denoting an array of benefits designed to promote new business activity or to encourage business or job retention. These benefits principally encompass tax and economic incentives provided by federal, state or local governmental bodies. Other entities, such as utilities and non-profits, can also make incentives available for these purposes. They accord the recipient, in some manner, a monetary benefit (i.e., tax incentives) or an in-kind benefit (e.g., state regulatory releases of environmental liability, municipal infrastructure improvements).  Private enterprises, including individuals, are generally the ultimate beneficiary of economic development incentives. Depending on the incentive in question, other qualified parties are eligible to receive them, as in the case of municipalities, utilities, or economic development agencies.

Typology of Incentives
Economic development incentives consist of two classes of benefits: (i) one mandatory or automatic and (ii) the other discretionary. The former classes of benefits generally comprise tax incentives, which are established by federal, state or local law, immediately triggered by a specified type of business activity. For example, a private enterprise automatically qualifies for a state sales and use tax exemption or rebate when it purchases manufacturing equipment. Discretionary incentives can consist of either tax or economic benefits and can be established by federal, state or local law, by policy of a public body or other entity, or by negotiation among transaction participants. Generally speaking, discretionary incentives consist of more complicated arrangements than automatic or mandatory incentives, and necessitate a private enterprise to solicit the incentive from, and to negotiate with, the public body or other entity conferring them.

Examples of Economic Development Incentives
The following illustrates economic development incentives made available to private enterprises or other recipients:

•	Industrial development bond financing, exempting interest from federal or state income taxes, for designated capital expenditures.

•	Federal or state new markets income tax credits for qualified capital investment for low-income communities or for low-income persons.

•	State or local taxable bond financing used to effect ad valorem property tax exemptions.

•	Tax increment financing, allocating all or a portion of new taxes (i.e., ad valorem property taxes, sales taxes) generated by projects or capital investment for the direct or indirect benefit of a private enterprise.

•	Federal or state job training grants funded to local governments or private enterprises for the training of new employees or the re-training of existing employees.

•	Refundable or non-refundable state income tax credits for job creation or retention, or capital investment, by private enterprises.

•	Enterprise or development zones, exempting all or a portion of certain taxes otherwise imposed on property or business activity within the zone from state or local taxes.

•	State and local low interest or forgivable loans made available to private enterprises financing capital investment.

•	State grants or subsidies by public bodies to private enterprises for new project development.

•	Local property transfers to private enterprises at below market or nominal consideration.

•	State and local grants for the rehabilitation of environmentally impacted sites (brownfields sites) funded to local governments or private enterprises.

•	Utility incentives provided by utilities or non-profits for capital investment.

•	Local property tax exemptions for construction or retrofitting of buildings to qualify for LEED certifications.

Considerations Affecting Economic Development Incentives

A number of factors come into play in the adoption of economic development incentive programs by public bodies. This section summarizes certain of these considerations.

Public bodies can develop well-articulated strategies, guiding their adoption and implementation of economic development programs. For example, the federal government can offer tax credits, encouraging development of renewable energy sources as a national initiative. A state can promulgate economic development legislation as a tactical move, seeking to expand the presence of a particular business sector in its jurisdiction, while a municipality can adopt a special property tax incentive program oriented toward redevelopment of its central business district.

An uninformed observation about incentives could lead one to the conclusion that a jurisdiction or local community with a weak business and employment base tends to offer more favorable incentives than one with a strong business and employment base.  Although this correlation exists in certain instances, it is by no means an accurate reflection in each case of the approach public bodies take in allocating incentives to private enterprises.  For instance, a state with a strong business and employment base can leverage its financial position to offer incentive packages to a certain business class as a way to participate in an emerging national business sector. Similarly, a municipality with a weak business and employment base can be reticent to offer economic development incentives because of financial and political consequences. A municipality fitting this profile, however, could be receptive to providing incentives based on new project taxes, not otherwise available to it, generated by the recipient.

The level of competition among adjacent jurisdictions or local communities, or other entities (i.e., utilities) can impact the adoption and implementation of these programs.  A state may legislate an aggressive incentive program to preempt adjacent states from luring inbound businesses to their jurisdictions. A local community may, however, offer economic development incentives merely as a defensive measure to maintain parity with adjacent communities.

The composition of a state's or local community's economic base can be a factor in the adoption of incentive programs.  A state may offer attractive incentive packages to an under-represented business class as a way to diversify its economy.  Similarly, a local community can orient its incentive policies toward particular businesses in an effort to counterbalance its reliance on one business sector (e.g., manufacturing).

The state and local tax structure of a jurisdiction can affect the availability of incentives in the jurisdiction A state may offer to private enterprises a variety of economic development incentives to offset a higher income or property tax regime. Conversely, a jurisdiction with a low tax structure can be less inclined to promulgate aggressive incentive programs to benefit private enterprises.

A public body's experience with an incentive program can impact its approach toward incentive arrangements. The prior experience with an insolvent company enrolled in a program can prompt a public body to adopt rigorous prequalification criteria as part of its incentive screening process. Likewise, the failure of a recipient to meet public body's expectations about a project (e.g., employment) can prompt it to impose strict project commitments on new incentive recipients. Conversely, an incentive program with a successful track record of business expansion or retention can encourage the expansion of the program or the adoption of new incentive programs.

Different constituencies affected by economic development policies can also influence tax incentive programs or arrangements. Taxpayers often use the courts as a vehicle to challenge tax incentives.  Taxing districts constitute another pool of opponents to these programs. For instance, certain school districts not infrequently challenge tax incentive programs or arrangements because of a reduction or loss of their tax revenue allocations.  Other public bodies can oppose tax incentives, as in the case of county tax authorities, because of their impact on taxing districts and public services.

Inducement Tests

Many discretionary incentive programs require the recipient to meet an inducement test as one criterion to qualify for the incentive.  Under this test, the recipient must demonstrate that the incentive in question has induced, on some basis, the targeted business activity. Depending on the program, it can consist on one end of the spectrum a stringent “but for test” used for tax exempt bond financing under federal tax law and frequently for many state taxable bond issue programs.  On the other end of the spectrum, it can be a broad standard of conduct, demonstrating the recipients’ general intention to initiate the targeted business activity as a result of the incentive.

A private enterprise seeking an incentive under a more stringent inducement test typically must obtain some governmental or other action authorizing the incentive, such as a resolution or ordinance, before it can make contractual arrangements for the incentivized activity. As a case in point, prior to waiving closing conditions to purchase real estate, or entering into binding vendor contracts for a new project, a private enterprise must receive a resolution or other governmental action, authorizing the incentive from the relevant public body to satisfy this test. Therefore, incentive programs which have more stringent inducement tests often create practical issues for a private enterprise seeking incentives. They necessitate careful management of the underlying business transaction and the incentive transaction, including milestone dates, to meet the legal requirements of the incentive and the business objectives of the recipient.

Clawbacks

State and local public bodies sometimes establish investment, employment or other project commitments, which must be met and maintained during a test period in exchange for discretionary incentives. Under these arrangements, the recipient must repay all or a portion of the benefit received, if it fails to meet or maintain the designated metric of performance during the test period. These recapture arrangements are commonly referred to as “clawbacks.”  For example, if a recipient fails to create or maintain a minimum level of new positions during a specified test period, it may be required to repay a portion of the benefit based on a prearranged formula.

In addition, non-governmental entities, such as utilities, can incorporate clawback provisions as part of their incentive packages. A utility offering an in-kind benefit to a private enterprise, such as the installation of on-site energy infrastructure improvements, can stipulate that the project must reach and maintain certain energy usage thresholds as a means for the utility to recover its investment. If the recipient fails to meet these requirements, the utility can assess a charge based on a prearranged formula analogous to a governmental clawback.

The Critique of Economic Development Incentives

Economic development incentives have come under close scrutiny from many quarters. They question the economic benefit to public bodies and local communities, and the wisdom of the public policies, promoting them. Some suggest that most incentives are relatively modest in relation to the incentivized business activity and, therefore, have no demonstrative impact on the recipient's decision making.  As a corollary, some argue economic development incentives merely facilitate the relocation of a private enterprise's business or employment from one venue to another venue, and do not foster any new meaningful business activity.  Under this line of reasoning, a recipient can relocate essentially the same operation from one community to another community in a jurisdiction by taking advantage of the other community's ad valorem property tax incentive program. The incentive, in effect, cannibalizes the public resources of the jurisdiction at the expense of affected taxing districts.

Some commentators have also contended that these programs contribute to the corruption of public officials in their administration as a basis to discredit them.  The media have publicized flagrant conduct by some companies, and the mismanagement by certain public bodies, under these programs as a repudiation of economic development incentives.

A Response to These Criticisms
Negative commentary about economic development incentives can result in sweeping generalizations, without distinguishing the incentives used, the public policy goals sought, or the transaction participants involved. Federal, state and local governmental bodies by their nature have individual agendas in adoption of economic development programs, although they may be complementary. For instance, a state may promulgate legislation, mindful of its economic base as a whole, while regional development consortiums and local public bodies primarily focus their attention on more local considerations.

Economic development incentives vary in purpose and by type. For instance, a utility incentive designed to foster economic development in a local community has distinctive characteristics and goals from an ad valorem property tax incentive used to encourage redevelopment of blighted areas in that community. Similarly, state tax incentives directed toward capital investment are different from state income tax credits based on employment.

Certain commentators view business operations or facilities as fungible objects, easily portable from one jurisdiction or community to another.  Business relocations can, in fact, require significant investment, resources and personnel for planning and implementation. They can be disruptive to the business and undermine morale of employees, if not properly managed. Therefore, such decisions are not made lightly by businesses, irrespective of the availability of incentives to facilitate them.

In addition, economic development incentives should not be viewed as merely promoting static business activity, but as structures promoting and capturing organic growth of the recipient at the project level and indirectly promoting growth of related businesses.  Public officials no doubt have this expectation in mind by authorizing economic development programs, even in business and employment retention incentives.

Critics of these programs also do not fully appreciate the increasing reliance of the private sector in today's business environment on economic development incentives for business expansion or retention.  Incentive packages can constitute a meaningful contribution toward project investment. Consequently, business enterprises with incentive experience, frequently will include incentives as part of project site selection checklists and will treat them as relevant budget line items.  As a case in point, a recipient relies on incentives to offset higher development or operation costs (i.e., site or labor costs) in its selection of a location for a new project. The emergence of public-private partnerships reflects the importance that the private enterprises place on the availability of economic development incentives under these initiatives.

Furthermore, the sporadic occurrence of mismanagement or misuse of these programs by either public officials or private enterprises should not be used to undermine their efficacy to promote economic development as a whole. The inclusion of tighter prequalification criteria and effective control and other measures in economic development transactions by public bodies and other sponsors should mitigate many of these anomalies.

See also
 *Discretionary Tax and Economic Incentives
 *Ghetto- United States
 *Economic Development
 *Economic Growth
 *Revenue Bonds
 *Investment Promotion Agency
 *Tax Increment Financing
 *Tax Increment Reinvestment Zone
 *Urban Decay
 *Urban Enterprise Zone
 *Urban Renewal

Notes

References

John Edwin Anderson, Robert W. Wassmer Bidding for Business: The Efficacy of Local Economic Development Incentives in a Metropolitan Area Upjohn Press (June 2000)
Timothy J. Bartik 2005. "Solving the Problems of Economic Development Incentives." Growth and Change 36 (Spring): 139-166.
Edward J. Blakely, Nancey Green Leigh Planning Local Economic Development: Theory and Practice Sage Publications, Inc; Fourth Edition (July 16, 2009)
Ted K. Bradshaw, Edward J. Blakely "What are “Third-Wave” State Economic Development Efforts? From Incentives to Industrial Policy" Economic Development Quarterly August 1999   vol. 13 no. 3 229-244
Breandán Ó hUallacháin and Mark A. Satterthwaite “Sectoral growth patterns at the metropolitan level: An evaluation of economic development incentives" Journal of Urban Economics Volume 31, Issue 1, January 1992, Pages 25–5
Alan Peters and Peter Fisher (2004). “The Failures of Economic Development Incentives.” Journal of the American Planning Association. 70(I, Winter):27-37.
Frederick W. Kindel, Discretionary Tax and Economic Incentives (Law Journal Press ed. 2014)
Irene S. Rubin and Herbert J. Rubin "Economic Development Incentives: The Poor (Cities) Pay more" Urban Affairs Review September 1987   vol. 23 no. 1 37-62

External links
 Panel Database on Incentives and Taxes. Created by Timothy J. Bartik and provided by the W.E. Upjohn Institute for Employment Research, this free database offers comprehensive information on business incentives for economic development provided by state and local governments.
 Municipal Research and Service Center of Washington- Seattle based organization
 ADP’s site to aid businesses in using local and state incentives
 Site of Charleston’s Coordinating Council for Economic Development
 Ohio Department of Development
 Discretionary Tax and Economic Incentives- a book that overviews discretionary state and local tax incentives by Frederick W. Kindel

Economic development